Georges Anthony (born 26 November 1890) was a Belgian rowing coxswain who won a bronze medal in the coxed pair at the 1928 Summer Olympics. He also took part in the eight event, but his team failed to reach the final. He was born in Liège.

References

External links
 

Olympic bronze medalists for Belgium
Olympic rowers of Belgium
Rowers at the 1928 Summer Olympics
1890 births
Year of death missing
Olympic medalists in rowing
Coxswains (rowing)
Belgian male rowers
Medalists at the 1928 Summer Olympics
20th-century Belgian people